Slavko Petrović (born 10 August 1958) is a Serbian professional football manager and former player. He is the manager of Spartak Subotica.

Playing career
Petrović was a goalkeeper at Red Star Belgrade. Although he made no league appearances for them, he went to Germany, where he spent most of his career playing with Fortuna Düsseldorf, Rot-Weiss Essen and Wormatia Worms. He won the 1979–80 DFB-Pokal while playing for Fortuna Düsseldorf.

Managerial career

Early career
During the late 1990s, Petrović became a manager in Germany, getting the job of assistant manager at Karlsruher SC in 1997 after coaching Alemannia Groß-Rohrheim and Amicitia Viernheim earlier. In the following season, he moved to SV Darmstadt 98 where he became the main manager. Until 2006, he was the manager of Carl Zeiss Jena, Fortuna Düsseldorf and Waldhof Mannheim. During the season 2007–08, he was coaching Zalaegerszegi in Hungary.

In January 2011, Petrović returned to Serbia and became the coach of SuperLiga club Borac Čačak. At the start of the 2011–12 season, he became the coach of Rad.

Radnik Bijeljina
On 5 September 2014, Petrović became the new manager of Bosnian Premier League club Radnik Bijeljina. He won the Bosnian cup with Radnik in the 2015–16 season, making that the club's highest achievement in its history.

Željezničar

2016–17 season

Petrović replaced Miloš Kostić as Željezničar manager after a terrible start to the 2016–17 season where the club was winless in four consecutive matches, three of which were lost (two at home) and without scoring a single goal. Since Petrović arrived, he guided the club to the 2017–18 UEFA Europa League Second qualifying round, having lost only two games in the league out of 25 games played (scoring 2.16 goals per game). At one point the club managed to stay top of the league for five weeks, but ultimately finished second overall due to a dubious penalty decision in injury time (game Radnik Bijeljina vs Zrinjski Mostar 1–2; while at the same time Sarajevo beat Željezničar in the Sarajevo derby 1–0), allowing Zrinjski to overtake Željezničar and win the Bosnian championship; a first domestic title for, Zrinjski manager at the time, Blaž Slišković, with Željezničar a point behind.

Throughout the league, Željezničar played simultaneously in the 2016–17 Bosnian Cup, where they were eliminated in the semifinals stage to the eventual cup winner Široki Brijeg. Under Petrović, Željezničar forward Ivan Lendrić finished as top goalscorer of the league with 19 scored goals.

2017–18 season
Petrović received support to remain as Željezničar for the next season. However just one day before the start of the season and the league match against GOŠK Gabela, Petrović got surprisingly sacked.

Sloboda Tuzla
In September 2017, Petrović was named the new manager of Sloboda Tuzla, after Vlado Jagodić left the club. He led Sloboda to the 2017–18 Bosnian cup semi-final, where the club lost to eventual cup winners Željezničar. Petrović also led Sloboda to a 10th-place finish in the league. Before the beginning of the 2018–19 season, Petrović left Sloboda.

Return to Radnik Bijeljina
On 13 January 2020, Petrović returned to Radnik Bijeljina  years after leaving the club back in the summer of 2016. In his first game back, Petrović's team drew against his former club Željezničar 0–0 in a league match on 22 February 2020. His first win since his return to Radnik came on 7 March 2020, a 5–1 home win against Zvijezda 09. Petrović decided to leave Radnik on 16 November 2020, saying that pressure and constant threats from fans forced him to make that decision.

Olimpik
On 12 December 2020, Petrović became the new manager of Olimpik. In his first league game as Olimpik manager, Petrović's team beat fis former club Radnik Bijeljina on the same day that he became manager. After the end of the 2020–21 season and Olimpik's relegation, Petrović left the club.

Managerial statistics

Honours

Player
Fortuna Düsseldorf
DFB-Pokal: 1979–80

Manager
Radnik Bijeljina 
Bosnian Cup: 2015–16
Republika Srpska Cup: 2015–16

References

External links

Slavko Petrović at wormatia.de

1958 births
Living people
Footballers from Belgrade
Yugoslav footballers
Serbian footballers
Association football goalkeepers
Red Star Belgrade footballers
Fortuna Düsseldorf players
Rot-Weiss Essen players
Wormatia Worms players
Serbian football managers
Premier League of Bosnia and Herzegovina managers
Fortuna Düsseldorf managers
SV Waldhof Mannheim managers
Zalaegerszegi TE managers
FK Rad managers
FK Borac Čačak managers
FK Radnik Bijeljina managers
FK Željezničar Sarajevo managers
FK Sloboda Tuzla managers
FK Olimpik managers